Palestine is an unincorporated community in Greenbrier County, West Virginia, United States. Palestine is located along the northeast border of Alderson.

References

Unincorporated communities in Greenbrier County, West Virginia
Unincorporated communities in West Virginia